Odysseus Velanas (born 5 June 1998) is a professional footballer who plays as a midfielder for NAC Breda. Born in Greece, he has represented the Netherlands at youth level.

Club career
Born in Samos, Greece, Velanas subsequently joined the youth system of VV Jonathan after moving to Holland at a young age, before he was later picked up by Utrecht in July 2013. Velanas made his professional debut in the second-tier Eerste Divisie for Jong FC Utrecht on 5 August 2016 in a game against NAC Breda. He played two matches for the first team in the 2017–18 season and otherwise played for Jong Utrecht.

After having had not played for the professional team in the first half of the 2018–19 season, he was sent on a six-month loan to second-tier Helmond Sport at the end of January 2019. Velanas suffered a thigh injury in his fourth league appearance on 22 February 2019 and was sidelined for large parts of the spring. By the end of the season he came to a total of six appearances. On 1 July 2019, Utrecht decided to extend his contract, an agreement which ran until the summer of 2022.

On 22 July 2021, he signed contract with NAC Breda for one year with an option for the second year.

International career
Holding both Dutch and Greek citizenship, Velanas has played for the Netherlands at under-17, under-18, and under-19 level.

References

External links
 
 

1998 births
Living people
People from Samos
Dutch footballers
Netherlands youth international footballers
Dutch people of Greek descent
Greek footballers
Greek expatriate footballers
Greek emigrants to the Netherlands
FC Utrecht players
Jong FC Utrecht players
Helmond Sport players
NAC Breda players
Eredivisie players
Eerste Divisie players
Association football midfielders
Sportspeople from the North Aegean